Chandan Singh may refer to:

 Chandan Singh (Air Vice Marshal) (1925–2020), Indian military officer
 Chandan Singh (athlete) (born 1987), Indian racewalker
 Chandan Singh (politician), Indian politician from Bihar
 Chandan Singh (Uttar Pradesh politician), Indian politician; represented Kairana Lok Sabha constituency 1977–1980

See also
 Chandan Singh Rawat (1928–2008), Indian footballer